Oliver Coker (born 9 March 2003) is an English footballer who plays as a midfielder for  club Southend United.

Early life and education
Coker grew up supporting Southend United and attended Greensward Academy in Hockley.

Career
He made his senior debut for Southend United on 6 October 2020 in a 3–0 home defeat to Portsmouth in the EFL Trophy. He made his league debut for the club as a late substitute in the final match of the season as the club drew 1–1 with Newport County. Across the 2020–21 season, he made three appearances in all competitions as Southend finished 23rd in League Two and were relegated to the National League. In July 2022, Coker signed a new two-year contract with the club holding the option for a further year.

Career statistics

References

External links
 
 

2003 births
Living people
English footballers
Association football midfielders
Southend United F.C. players
English Football League players